The 2011 Good Sam Club 500 was a NASCAR Sprint Cup Series race held on October 23, 2011 at Talladega Superspeedway in Talladega, Alabama. Clint Bowyer defended his win in the previous year's race by slingshotting past his Richard Childress Racing teammate Jeff Burton on the final lap. It was the 100th career win for Richard Childress Racing. For Richard Childress Racing, it would be the last time their cars finished 1-2 until the 2020 O'Reilly Auto Parts 500.

Qualifying 
Mark Martin won the pole position with a time of 52.799, beating Jimmie Johnson who had a time of 52.801.

Race

The race saw 9 caution flags for 37 laps under caution. The race took about 3 and half hours.

Race results

References

Good Sam Club 500
Good Sam Club 500
NASCAR races at Talladega Superspeedway
October 2011 sports events in the United States